Lars Heinermann (16 February 1943) is a Swedish former footballer who played as a forward.

References

Living people
1943 births
Association football forwards
Swedish footballers
Swedish expatriate footballers
Sweden international footballers
Expatriate soccer players in the United States
Swedish expatriate sportspeople in the United States
Allsvenskan players
Degerfors IF players
IF Elfsborg players
Detroit Cougars (soccer) players
Washington Whips players
North American Soccer League (1968–1984) players